The Radiodiffusion Télévision du Burkina is the national broadcaster of the West African state of Burkina Faso. Radiodiffusion Télévision du Burkina is headquartered in the capital city Ouagadougou. Generaldirector (CEO) of RTB is Marcel Toé.

RTB started broadcasting on 12 October 1959. During the 2014 uprising, protesters stormed the building of the RTB, seized the technical equipment and stopped broadcasts of the TVB and RB.

At the January 2022 Burkina Faso coup d'état the mutinous soldiers declared on RTB television on 24 January 2022, that a military junta of Paul-Henri Sandaogo Damiba and his "Patriotic Movement for Safeguard and Restoration" had seized control of Burkina Faso.

On the same year, eight months later, (see September 2022 Burkina Faso coup d'état) RTB television stopped broadcasting for hours until a group of soldiers, led by Ibrahim Traoré, announced the fall of Paul-Henri Sandaogo Damiba due to his inability to deal with jihadism in the country, they also announced a curfew, the suspension of all political and civil society activities, of the Constitution of Burkina Faso and closed all air and land borders.

See also
 Media of Burkina Faso

References

External links

Publicly funded broadcasters
Television stations in Burkina Faso
Television channels and stations established in 1975
State media